Frankton is a town in Pipe Creek and Lafayette townships, Madison County, Indiana, United States. It is part of the Anderson, Indiana Metropolitan Statistical Area. The population was 1,862 at the 2010 census.

History
Frankton was laid out in 1853. It was incorporated as a town in 1871.

Geography
Frankton is located at  (40.222213, -85.771806).

Demographics

2010 census
As of the census of 2010, there were 1,862 people, 732 households, and 531 families living in the town. The racial makeup of the town was 97.5% White, 0.4% African American, 0.1% Native American, 0.1% Asian, 0.9% from other races, and 1.1% from two or more races. Hispanic or Latino of any race were 2.2% of the population.

There were 732 households, of which 35.9% had children under the age of 18 living with them; 52.9% were married couples living together; 14.6% had a female householder with no husband present; 5.1% had a male householder with no wife present; and 27.5% were non-families. 24.2% of all households were made up of individuals, and 10.2% had someone living alone who was 65 years of age or older. The average household size was 2.54 and the average family size was 3.00.

The median age in the town was 38.2 years. 26.9% of residents were under the age of 18; 7% were between the ages of 18 and 24; 25.3% were from 25 to 44; 26.5% were from 45 to 64; and 14.3% were 65 years of age or older. The gender makeup of the town was 48.7% male and 51.3% female.

2000 census
As of the census of 2000, there were 1,905 people, 752 households, and 560 families living in the town. The racial makeup of the town was 97.85% White, 0.05% African American, 0.10% Native American, 0.31% Asian, 1.21% from other races, and 0.47% from two or more races. Hispanic or Latino of any race were 1.63% of the population.

There were 752 households, out of which 34.8% had children under the age of 18 living with them, 59.0% were married couples living together, 10.9% had a female householder with no husband present, and 25.4% were non-families. 22.2% of all households were made up of individuals, and 9.2% had someone living alone who was 65 years of age or older. The average household size was 2.53 and the average family size was 2.94.

In the town, the population was spread out, with 26.6% under the age of 18, 8.9% from 18 to 24, 28.6% from 25 to 44, 21.9% from 45 to 64, and 14.0% who were 65 years of age or older. The median age was 35 years. For every 100 females, there were 93.8 males. For every 100 females age 18 and over, there were 91.0 males.

The median income for a household in the town was $39,130, and the median income for a family was $44,474. Males had a median income of $35,750 versus $22,179 for females. The per capita income for the town was $17,232. About 6.5% of families and 8.1% of the population were below the poverty line, including 10.5% of those under age 18 and 4.4% of those age 65 or over.

Education
Frankton has a public library, a branch of the North Madison County Public Library System.

Arts and culture
The annual Heritage Days Festival, held each year in the fall since 1975, is one way in which the town tries to promote a sense of community. The festival includes a car show, arts, crafts, games, live entertainment and more. The Heritage Days Festival was the recipient of the Best Small Festival Award for 2013.

Notable people
 Isabel Withers (1896–1968), stage, motion picture, and television actress, born in Frankton.
 Albert Henry Vestal, Republican, U.S. House of Representatives and House Majority Whip 1921 to 1937, was born and raised in Frankton.

References

External links
 

Towns in Madison County, Indiana
Towns in Indiana